Wilson is an unincorporated community in Menominee County, Michigan Wilson is located in Harris Township along U.S. Highway 2 (US 2), US 41 and the Canadian National Railway,  east-northeast of Powers, Michigan. Wilson has a post office with ZIP code 49896.

History 

The Chicago and North Western Railway built a station at the community in 1872–73 to serve local charcoal kilns, which was originally called Ferry Switch. The first school in Wilson opened in 1881–82. A post office, originally called Myra, opened in the community on February 24, 1881; Daniel McIntyre was the first postmaster. The post office was renamed to Wilson on November 1, 1881, after local sawmill owner Frank D. Wilson, who then became postmaster. The railway station closed in 1950.

Seventh-day Adventist Church 
The central buildings in the rural Wilson community are the Seventh-day Adventist Church and school. Wilson is home to the largest Adventist church in the Upper Peninsula of Michigan. The church also operates a Junior Academy, enrolling grades 1 – 10.

In the early 1900s, a group of Adventists from Wisconsin moved into the area and began farming. A church was erected in 1908 and services were originally held in French. The first minister was R.J. Bellows. In 1948, a furnace fire caused the church to be demolished, however, a new church was built and completed in 1949.

A small area at the back of the church was partitioned off as a schoolroom, however, the space was inadequate and in 1947, a public school building was purchased from the Ford River Township and moved onto land across from the church. In 1964, the original school was torn down and a new three-room school with a gymnasium was built. The school is still in operation today.

Many of the descendants of those who helped to establish the community by building the church and school still live in the area.

Education
Wilson is in the Bark River-Harris School District.

Hannahville Indian School is nearby.

References

Unincorporated communities in Menominee County, Michigan
Unincorporated communities in Michigan